The men's three event competition in water skiing at the 2005 World Games took place from 20 to 23 July 2005 at the Sportpark Wedau, Regattabahn in Duisburg, Germany.

Competition format
A total of 17 athletes entered the competition. In this competition athletes compete in three events: slalom, tricks and jump. Best ten athletes from preliminary round qualifies to the final.

Results

Preliminary

Final

References

External links
 Results on IWGA website

Water skiing at the 2005 World Games